HYT may refer to:
 HYT (watchmaker), Swiss 
 High Year Tenure, in the US Armed Forces
 Hueytown, Alabama, US
 Hyde North railway station, England, station code
 Hytera, formerly HYT, a Chinese radio manufacturer